Galimberti is an Italian surname. Notable people with the surname include:

Carlo Galimberti, Italian weightlifter
Giorgio Galimberti, Italian tennis player
Jacopo Galimberti (born 1993), Italian footballer
José Galimberti (born 1896), Brazilian athlete
Luigi Galimberti, Italian cardinal
Orietta Galimberti, best known as Orietta Berti (born 1943), Italian pop-folk singer, actress and television personality
Pablo Galimberti, Uruguayan Roman Catholic bishop
Paolo Galimberti (born 1968), Italian politician and entrepreneur
Tancredi Galimberti, Italian politician

Italian-language surnames